Garmali may refer to the following places in South Asia :

In Afghanistan :
 Garmali, Afghanistan

In India, two villages, each also seat of a former princely state, on Saurashtra peninsula, in Gujarat :
 Garmali Moti
 Garmali Nani